The William Soaper Farm in Henderson, Kentucky was listed on the National Register of Historic Places in 2001.

This area includes 13 contributing buildings, a contributing structure, and a contributing site, as well as two non-contributing buildings.

The buildings include:
William Soaper Home (c. 1808), built as a log dogtrot building, expanded in 1834 to enclose the dogtrot and to add a second story, converting it into an I-house.

References

Farms on the National Register of Historic Places in Kentucky
Greek Revival architecture in Kentucky
Houses completed in 1808
National Register of Historic Places in Henderson County, Kentucky
1808 establishments in Kentucky
I-houses in Kentucky
Houses on the National Register of Historic Places in Kentucky
Henderson, Kentucky
Dogtrot architecture in Kentucky